Konstantin Sergeyevich Kotov (born 25 June 1998) is a Russian football player. He plays for FC Slutsk.

Club career
He made his debut in the Russian Professional Football League for FC Luki-Energiya Velikiye Luki on 3 September 2018 in a game against FC Leningradets Leningrad Oblast.

International
He represented Russia national under-17 football team at the 2015 UEFA European Under-17 Championship, where Russia reached semifinals and Kotov played in every game, and at the 2015 FIFA U-17 World Cup, where he played one game against Ecuador in the knock-out stage.

References

External links
 Profile by Russian Professional Football League
 
 

1998 births
Footballers from Saint Petersburg
Living people
Russian footballers
Russian expatriate footballers
Russia youth international footballers
Association football midfielders
FC Zenit Saint Petersburg players
FC Nosta Novotroitsk players
FC Smolevichi players
FC Slutsk players
Russian Second League players
Belarusian Premier League players
Russian expatriate sportspeople in Belarus
Expatriate footballers in Belarus